"Millionaire" is a song by American DJ trio Cash Cash and British DJ Digital Farm Animals. It features vocals from American rapper Nelly, and was released digitally as the eighth single from their fourth studio album, Blood, Sweat & 3 Years (2016), on June 3, 2016. The song was written by Nelly, Nicholas Gale, Eldra Debarge, Etterlene Jordan, Jason Epperson, Alexander Makhlouf, Jean Paul Makhlouf, Lavell Webb, and Samuel Frisch, with production being handled by Cash Cash and Digital Farm Animals.

Music video
A music video for the song, directed by Sesan Ogunro, was released on June 27, 2016.

Track listing

Awards and nominations

Charts

Weekly charts

Year-end charts

Certifications

Release history

References

2016 songs
2016 singles
Cash Cash songs
Digital Farm Animals songs
Nelly songs
Songs written by Nelly
Songs written by Jay E
Songs written by Digital Farm Animals
Songs written by El DeBarge
Song recordings produced by Digital Farm Animals